The International Information System Security Certification Consortium, or (ISC)2, is a non-profit organization which specializes in training and certifications for cybersecurity professionals. It has been described as the "world's largest IT security organization". The most widely known certification offered by (ISC)2 is the Certified Information Systems Security Professional (CISSP) certification.

History
In the mid-1980s a need arose for a standardized and vendor-neutral certification program that provided structure and demonstrated competence in the field of IT security, and several professional societies recognized that certification programs attesting to the qualifications of information security personnel were desperately needed.
 
In June 1988, a conference was hosted by the National Institutes of Standards and Technology (NIST) and the Federal Information Systems Security Educators Association (FISSEA) at Idaho State University in Pocatello, Idaho to address the need for standardized curriculum for the burgeoning profession. Organizations in attendance included:

 Canadian Information Processing Society (CIPS)
 Computer Security Institute (CSI)
 Data Processing Management Association Special Interest Group for Certified Professionals (DPMA SIG-CP)
 Data Processing Management Association Special Interest Group for Computer Security (DPMA SIG-CS)
 Idaho State University (ISU)
 Information Systems Security Association (ISSA) 
 International Federation for Information Processing (IFIP)

During the conference, the question was raised why virtually every group represented, save NIST and ISU, was creating a professional certification. The conference participants agreed to form a consortium that would attempt to bring together the competing agendas of the various organizations. In November 1988, the Special Interest Group for Computer Security (SIG-CS), a member of the Data Processing Management Association (DPMA), brought together several organizations interested in this. The (ISC)2 was formed in mid-1989 as a non-profit organization with this goal in mind [8].

By 1990, the first working committee to establish something called the Common Body of Knowledge (CBK) had been formed. The work done by that committee resulted in the first version of CBK being finalized by 1992, with the CISSP credential launched by 1994, followed by the SSCP credential in 2001, the CAP credential in 2005, and the CSSLP credential in 2008, the CCFP and HCISPP in 2013 and the CCSP in 2015.[9]

In 2001, (ISC)2 established its Europe, Middle East and Africa regional office in London. In 2002, (ISC)2 opened its Asia-Pacific regional office in Hong Kong. In 2015, (ISC)2 introduced its North America regional office in Washington, D.C.

Since 2011, (ISC)2 organizes the annual (ISC)2 Security Congress conference. The 2019 conference will be the first international iteration of the event and will be held in Orlando, Florida.

Professional certifications
(ISC)2 maintains what it calls a Common Body of Knowledge for information security for the following certifications:

 Certified Information Systems Security Professional (CISSP), including:
Information Systems Security Architecture Professional (CISSP-ISSAP)
 Information Systems Security Engineering Professional (CISSP-ISSEP)
 Information Systems Security Management Professional (CISSP-ISSMP)
and including:
 Certified Secure Software Lifecycle Professional (CSSLP)
 Certified Authorization Professional (CAP)
 Certified Cloud Security Professional (CCSP)
 Systems Security Certified Practitioner (SSCP)
 Health Care Information Security and Privacy Practitioner (HCISPP)

It is certified by ANSI that (ISC)2 meets the requirements of ANSI/ISO/IEC Standard 17024, a personnel certification accreditation program. That accreditation covers the CISSP, SSCP, CISSP-ISSAP, CISSP-ISSEP, CISSP-ISSMP, CAP, and CSSLP certifications.

Continuous Professional Education
All (ISC)2 certified professionals are required to earn Continuous Professional Education (CPE) credits on an annual basis in order to maintain their certifications. CPE credits can be obtained by attending industry events or conferences, writing articles/book reviews/books, etc.

Code of Ethics
All certified (ISC)2 professionals are required to support the (ISC)2 Code of Ethics. Violations of the code of ethics are each investigated by a peer review panel, within the potential of revoking the certification. (ISC)2 (along with other security certification organizations) has been criticized for lack of education in the area of ethics.

See also
 Certified Information Systems Security Professional
 UK cyber security community
 ISACA

References

External links
The (ISC)2 website

 
ISC
Non-profit organizations based in Florida
Organizations established in 1988
Companies based in St. Petersburg, Florida